Malika Favre (born 1 December 1982) is a French illustrator and graphic artist based in Barcelona. Her style of works could be characterized by pure minimalism within Pop art and Op art, where it sometimes described as 'Pop Art meets Op Art'. She combines simple illustrations with geometric patterns and has developed a unique style of illustration by using positive and negative space and colours, elegant layouts, especially of the female body and its curves.

Early life and education
Malika Favre was born on 1 December 1982 in the Paris region, France, and grew up there. Her mother was a painter. After high school Favre went to a science prep school because she thought that she wanted to become a quantic engineer. She graduated from Olivier de Serres, and moved to London, to study illustration at Surrey Institute of Art & Design, University College in Farnham.

Career

Favre did an internship for three months at Airside, a British design studio which closed in 2012. In 2006, she started work as an Art Director at Airside, which led to collaborations with numerous high-profile magazines and clients including wallpaper and The Sunday Times. She also worked for UNIT9 in 2006. In 2011 she left Airside to set herself up as an independent illustrator.

Works
Favre is an independent illustrator and has worked on a variety of projects spanning editorial, advertising and publishing. Her unique graphics style, mixing Pop and Op art, is featured by companies such as Sephora, Le Bon Marché, Penguin Books, and newspapers such as Vogue, The New York Times, The New Yorker, The Sunday Times, and Vanity Fair.

In 2021, Favre illustrated the poster for Barcelona's annual La Mercè festival.

Cover Illustrations
With Bags and Swags: Around Australia in the Forties (2008, by Wendy Suart)
 London at home (2010, by Magda Segal)
Kama Sutra (Penguin Classics Deluxe Edition), (2012, by Vatsyayana)
 When the Rains Come (2012, by Tom Pow)
 The Burgermat Show (2013, by Burgerac)
 Stickyscapes Paris (2015)
 Illustration: A Theoretical and Contextual Perspective (2017, by Alan Male)
 This Impossible Light (2017, by Lily Myers)
 Love by the Book (2017, by Melissa Pimentel)

See also
Graphic arts
Graphic design
Pop art
Op art

References

External links

1982 births
Living people
21st-century French artists
French designers
French graphic designers
French poster artists
Artists from Paris
Pop artists
Op art
The New Yorker people